Lambertseter is a station on Lambertseter Line on the Oslo Metro, served by Line 4. It is located between Karlsrud to the north and Munkelia to the south.

The station is located on the west side of the Lambertseter shopping mall. A road bridge runs over the platform area. The largely residential Lambertseter neighborhood is one of the traditional suburbs of Oslo. Rail connections to the area were by tram from 1957 and replaced with the modern subway in 1966.

References

External links

Oslo Metro stations in Oslo
Railway stations opened in 1957
1957 establishments in Norway
Lambertseter